.pa is the Internet country code top-level domain (ccTLD) for Panama. It was first registered in 1994-05-25. It is administered by NIC Panamá, which is run by the Universidad Tecnologica de Panama.

Because "PA" is also the postal code for the U.S. state of Pennsylvania and the Brazilian state of Pará, it has had occasional use under that meaning, but this has not become widespread.

Structure
Registrations are taken directly at the second level, and at the third level under the designated second level domains.

Restrictions

Any term that is listed in the list of reserved terms cannot be registered as a domain name. The list consists of, but limited to, other generic and country-code TLDs, country names, governmental entities, and DNS related terminology.

The server the domain points to can be located in any country; with the exception of .gob.pa domains, which are used solely for Panamanian Government agencies or institutions, should point to a server physically located in Panama.

References

External links

 IANA .pa whois information

Country code top-level domains
Telecommunications in Panama

sv:Toppdomän#P